The Hostage Heart is a 1977 American made-for-television drama film directed by Bernard McEveety, written by Andrew J. Fenady, and based on Gerald Green's novel. It premiered on Friday, September 9, 1977, on CBS.

Plot
Terrorists take over the operating room where a billionaire is having  coronary bypass surgery and demand a $10 million ransom.

Cast
 Sharon Acker as Martha Lake
 Stephen Davies as John Trask
 George DiCenzo as Chief George Reinhold
 Cameron Mitchell as Arnold Stade
 Peter Palmer as Dr. Licata
 Belinda Montgomery as Fiona
 Allan Rich as Dr. Motzkin
 Paul Shenar as James Cardone
 Robert Walden as Brian O'Donnell
 Carl Weathers as Bateman Hooks
 Bradford Dillman as Dr. Eric Lake
 Loretta Swit as Chris LeBlanc
 Vic Morrow as Steve Rockewicz
 Hari Rhodes as Don Harris
 Ralph Taeger as Lt. Dawson

Production
Sharon Acker and Bradford Dillman were cast in June 1977.  A registered nurse supervised the medical scenes.

External links

References

1977 television films
1977 films
1977 drama films
American drama television films
Films about terrorism in the United States
Films scored by Fred Karlin
Films set in hospitals
Films based on American novels
CBS network films
1970s English-language films
1970s American films